The 1945–46 Ranji Trophy was the 12th season of the Ranji Trophy. Holkar won the title defeating Baroda in the final.

Highlights
Holkar scored 912 for 8 decl against Mysore in the semifinal. This was the highest score in Indian first class cricket until Hyderabad made 944 for 6 against Andhra in 1993–94.
Six batsmen scored hundreds for Holkar: Kamal Bhandarkar 142, Chandu Sarwate 101, Madhavsinh Jagdale 164, C. K. Nayudu 101, Bhausaheb Nimbalkar 172 and Rameshwar Pratap Singh 100. This has never been equalled.
There were seven century partnerships in the Holkar innings. All wickets from one to eight, except the second, made more than 100 runs.
B. K. Garudachar took 4 wickets for 301. This is the most expensive bowling in Indian cricket, and third most expensive in all first-class cricket.
Chandu Sarwate took 9 for 61 in the Mysore first innings in addition to his hundred. It is the only instance of a century and nine wickets in an innings in Indian cricket.
Mysore conceded defeat on the fourth day.
Baroda won the Zonal finals and the Semifinals by the spin of a coin, as both matches were unable to produce a winner. The Zonal finals were drawn with the first innings incomplete, while their semifinal ended in a tie.
Vijay Merchant averaged 405.00 with the bat (405 in two innings, once out). This is the highest batting average achieved for any Ranji season.
C. K. Nayudu scored 200 for Holkar v Baroda in the final at the age of 50 years and 142 days. He is the oldest Indian cricketer to score a double hundred and the fifth oldest in all first class cricket after Dave Nourse, John King, Archie MacLaren and Jack Hobbs.

Zonal Matches

South Zone

West Zone 

(T) – Advanced to next round by spin of coin.

East Zone

North Zone

Inter-Zonal Knockout matches

(T) – Advanced to finals by spin of coin.

Final

Scorecards and averages
Cricketarchive

References

External links

1946 in Indian cricket
Indian domestic cricket competitions